Quantum optics is a branch of atomic, molecular, and optical physics dealing with how individual quanta of light, known as photons, interact with atoms and molecules. It includes the study of the particle-like properties of photons. Photons have been used to test many of the counter-intuitive predictions of quantum mechanics, such as entanglement and teleportation, and are a useful resource for quantum information processing.

History
Light propagating in a restricted volume of space has its energy and momentum quantized according to an integer number of particles known as photons.  Quantum optics studies the nature and effects of light as quantized photons. The first major development leading to that understanding was the correct modeling of the blackbody radiation spectrum by  Max Planck in 1899 under the hypothesis of light being emitted in discrete units of energy. The photoelectric effect was further evidence of this quantization as explained by Albert Einstein in a 1905 paper, a discovery for which he was to be awarded the Nobel Prize in 1921. Niels Bohr showed that the hypothesis of optical radiation being quantized corresponded to his theory of the quantized energy levels of atoms, and the spectrum of discharge emission from hydrogen in particular. The understanding of the interaction between light and matter following these developments was crucial for the development of quantum mechanics as a whole. However, the subfields of quantum mechanics dealing with matter-light interaction were principally regarded as research into matter rather than into light; hence one rather spoke of atom physics and quantum electronics in 1960. Laser science—i.e., research into principles, design and application of these devices—became an important field, and the quantum mechanics underlying the laser's principles was studied now with more emphasis on the properties of light, and the name quantum optics became customary.

As laser science needed good theoretical foundations, and also because research into these soon proved very fruitful, interest in quantum optics rose. Following the work of Dirac in quantum field theory, John R. Klauder, George Sudarshan, Roy J. Glauber, and Leonard Mandel applied quantum theory to the electromagnetic field in the 1950s and 1960s to gain a more detailed understanding of photodetection and the statistics of light (see degree of coherence). This led to the introduction of the coherent state as a concept which addressed  variations between laser light, thermal light, exotic squeezed states, etc. as it became understood that light cannot be fully described just referring to the electromagnetic fields describing the waves in the classical picture. In 1977, Kimble et al. demonstrated a single atom emitting one photon at a time, further compelling evidence that light consists of photons. Previously unknown quantum states of light with characteristics unlike classical states, such as squeezed light were subsequently discovered.

Development of short and ultrashort laser pulses—created by Q switching and modelocking techniques—opened the way to the study of what became known as ultrafast processes. Applications for solid state research (e.g. Raman spectroscopy) were found, and mechanical forces of light on matter were studied. The latter led to levitating and positioning clouds of atoms or even small biological samples in an optical trap or optical tweezers by laser beam. This, along with Doppler cooling and Sisyphus cooling, was the crucial technology needed to achieve the celebrated Bose–Einstein condensation.

Other remarkable results are the demonstration of quantum entanglement, quantum teleportation, and quantum logic gates. The latter are of much interest in quantum information theory, a subject which partly emerged from quantum optics, partly from theoretical computer science.

Today's fields of interest among quantum optics researchers include parametric down-conversion, parametric oscillation, even shorter (attosecond) light pulses, use of quantum optics for quantum information, manipulation of single atoms, Bose–Einstein condensates, their application, and how to manipulate them (a sub-field often called atom optics), coherent perfect absorbers, and much more. Topics classified under the term of quantum optics, especially as applied to engineering and technological innovation, often go under the modern term photonics.

Several Nobel prizes have been awarded for work in quantum optics. These were awarded:
 in 2012, Serge Haroche and David J. Wineland "for ground-breaking experimental methods that enable measuring & manipulation of individual quantum systems".
 in 2005,  Theodor W. Hänsch, Roy J. Glauber and John L. Hall
 in 2001,  Wolfgang Ketterle, Eric Allin Cornell and Carl Wieman
 in 1997,  Steven Chu, Claude Cohen-Tannoudji and William Daniel Phillips

Concepts
According to quantum theory, light may be considered not only to be as an electro-magnetic wave but also as a "stream" of particles called photons which travel with c, the vacuum speed of light. These particles should not be considered to be classical billiard balls, but as quantum mechanical particles described by a wavefunction spread over a finite region.

Each particle carries one quantum of energy, equal to hf, where h is Planck's constant and f is the frequency of the light. That energy possessed by a single photon corresponds exactly to the transition between discrete energy levels in an atom (or other system) that emitted the photon; material absorption of a photon is the reverse process. Einstein's explanation of spontaneous emission also predicted the existence of stimulated emission, the principle upon which the laser rests. However, the actual invention of the maser (and laser) many years later was dependent on a method to produce a population inversion.

The use of statistical mechanics is fundamental to the concepts of quantum optics: light is described in terms of field operators for creation and annihilation of photons—i.e. in the language of quantum electrodynamics.

A frequently encountered state of the light field is the coherent state, as introduced by E.C. George Sudarshan in 1960. This state, which can be used to approximately describe the output of a single-frequency laser well above the laser threshold, exhibits Poissonian photon number statistics. Via certain nonlinear interactions, a coherent state can be transformed into a squeezed coherent state, by applying a squeezing operator which can exhibit super- or sub-Poissonian photon statistics. Such light is called squeezed light. Other important quantum aspects are related to correlations of photon statistics between different beams. For example, spontaneous parametric down-conversion can generate so-called 'twin beams', where (ideally) each photon of one beam is associated with a photon in the other beam.

Atoms are considered as quantum mechanical oscillators with a discrete energy spectrum, with the transitions between the energy eigenstates being driven by the absorption or emission of light according to Einstein's theory.

For solid state matter, one uses the energy band models of solid state physics. This is important for understanding how light is detected by solid-state devices, commonly used in experiments.

Quantum electronics
Quantum electronics is a term that was used mainly between the 1950s and 1970s to denote the area of physics dealing with the effects of quantum mechanics on the behavior of electrons in matter, together with their interactions with photons. Today, it is rarely considered a sub-field in its own right, and it has been absorbed by other fields. Solid state physics regularly takes quantum mechanics into account, and is usually concerned with electrons. Specific applications of quantum mechanics in electronics is researched within semiconductor physics. The term also encompassed the basic processes of laser operation, which is today studied as a topic in quantum optics. Usage of the term overlapped early work on the quantum Hall effect and quantum cellular automata.

See also

 Atomic, molecular, and optical physics
 Attophysics
 Nonclassical light
 Optomechanics
 Quantum control
 Optical phase space
 Optical physics
 Optics
 Quantization of the electromagnetic field
 Two-state quantum system
 Spinplasmonics
 Valleytronics

Notes

References
 
 The Nobel Prize in Physics 2005

Further reading
 L. Mandel, E. Wolf Optical Coherence and Quantum Optics (Cambridge 1995).
 D. F. Walls and G. J. Milburn Quantum Optics (Springer 1994).
 Crispin Gardiner and Peter Zoller, Quantum Noise (Springer 2004).
 H.M. Moya-Cessa and F. Soto-Eguibar, Introduction to Quantum Optics (Rinton Press 2011).
 M. O. Scully and  M. S. Zubairy Quantum Optics (Cambridge 1997).
 W. P. Schleich Quantum Optics in Phase Space (Wiley 2001).

External links

 An introduction to quantum optics of the light field
 Encyclopedia of laser physics and technology, with content on quantum optics (particularly quantum noise in lasers), by Rüdiger Paschotta.
 Qwiki - A quantum physics wiki devoted to providing technical resources for practicing quantum physicists.
 Quantiki - a free-content WWW resource in quantum information science that anyone can edit.
 Various Quantum Optics Reports

 
Optics